The Bound was a British 4 wheeled cyclecar made in 1920 by Bound Brothers of Southampton, England.

The car had single seat bodywork and was very narrow.  Power came from a single cylinder Precision engine rated at 3½ horsepower and drive was to the rear wheels via a friction transmission. Very few were made.

See also
 List of car manufacturers of the United Kingdom

References 

Cyclecars
Defunct motor vehicle manufacturers of England
Vehicle manufacturing companies established in 1920
Companies based in Southampton